The Pan-Iranist parliamentary group was caucus of the Pan-Iranist Party in the National Consultative Assembly.

History 
The group was reactivated when it split from the Resurgence Party's majority fraction, and was officially revived on 19 June 1978 with four members.

Seats

Members

References 

Iranian Parliament fractions
1967 establishments in Iran